No. 30 Squadron  (Rhinos) is a fighter squadron and is equipped with Su-30MKI and based at Lohegaon Air Force Station as part of South Western Air Command.

It was the Presidential standards on 10 November 2016.

Assignments 
 Indo-Pakistani War of 1965
 Indo-Pakistani War of 1971

Aircraft

References

030